The National Collegiate Honors Council (NCHC) is an association of undergraduate honors programs,  colleges, directors, deans, faculty, staff, and students. The organization has its national headquarters at The University of Nebraska-Lincoln. It was formed in 1966 in response to the dissolving of a previous honors association.

It is a non-profit 501c3 organization with a 20-member Board of Directors. The 2018 office holders are: President Naomi Yavneh Klos, Loyola University New Orleans; President Elect Richard Badenhausen, Westminster College; Vice President Elaine Torda, Orange County Community College (SUNY); Immediate Past President Art Spisak, University of Iowa; Treasurer Steven Engel, Georgia Southern University and Secretary Kyoko Amano, Lock Haven University.

Publications 
NCHC publishes two refereed journals and a monograph series: The Journal of the National College Honors Council (JHNCH) focused on honors education, Honors in Practice (HIP) focused on operations of honors education, and the monograph series distributes informational books.

Annual conference 
Each fall, NCHC holds its annual conference in a major city in the United States.

References

External links 
 

Education-related professional associations
Educational institutions established in 1966
1966 establishments in the United States
University programs